The Nuneaton by-election of 9 March 1967 was held after the resignation of Labour MP (MP) Frank Cousins.

The seat was safe, having been won by Labour at the 1966 United Kingdom general election by over 11,000 votes

Candidates
Les Huckfield for Labour was selected at a time when he was a lecturer at the University of Birmingham
David Knox was selected for the Conservatives. He later became an MP for Staffordshire Moorlands
The local Liberal Party association nominated Alan Meredith who had stood in the seat previously
John Creasey nominated himself as candidate for the All Party Alliance, which he had founded
Air Vice-Marshal Don Bennett, a former MP, was the nominee for the National Party

Result of the previous general election

Result of the by-election

References

1967 elections in the United Kingdom
1967 in England
20th century in Warwickshire
Nuneaton and Bedworth
By-election, 1966